John Andrew Tarver (born January 1, 1949) is a former professional American football running back in the National Football League. He was drafted by the New England Patriots in the 7th round (166th overall) of the 1972 NFL Draft out of Colorado. He played four seasons for the Patriots (1972–1974) and the Philadelphia Eagles (1975).
John Tarver's son, Seth plays for the Idaho Stampede.

Outstanding athlete at Arvin High School, and Colorado University.

American football running backs
Colorado Buffaloes football players
New England Patriots players
Philadelphia Eagles players
Players of American football from Bakersfield, California
1949 births
Living people